Plaster Stadium (formerly SMS Stadium, Briggs Stadium, and Plaster Sports Complex) is a 17,500-seat football stadium located in Springfield, Missouri. It is home to the Missouri State Bears football team.

History
The stadium was built in 1941 as SMS Stadium, a Works Progress Administration project at a cost of only $60,000, before World War II broke out.  Its original seating capacity was 8,500.  In 1970 it was renamed Briggs Stadium after Arthur Briggs, the school's all-time winningest coach.

Renovations
In 1991, the stadium was renamed the Plaster Sports Complex in honor of Robert W. Plaster, chairman of Evergreen Investments of Lebanon, Missouri.  Mr. Plaster donated funds for major renovations of the stadium, including expansion of the stadium to its current capacity, including the addition of an upper deck which seats 8,500, 24 luxury suites holding 10 each, a 40-seat luxury box and a new press box.  In addition, a new running track and new artificial turf were installed.

The artificial turf was replaced in 2001 with a FieldTurf surface and in 2006 a new FieldTurf surface was installed. A new scoreboard was added in 2008. It was determined that at the conclusion of the 2013 football season, the aging student (East) bleachers would be torn down. After the student body passed the B.E.A.R. Fee, money was in place to rebuild the student section (East) side. The stadium renovation also included the removal of the track as well as the re-positioning of the field with a new Sport Turf playing surface.

Robert W. Plaster Stadium also includes 12 American handball/racquetball courts, including two courts with spectator seating. The complex also features Health and Fitness, and Athletics Strength and Conditioning centers on the second level of the stadium.

High school football
For many years Plaster Stadium held many of the annual Missouri State High School Activities Association state football championship games. In 1996 all games were moved to the Edward Jones Dome in St. Louis, where they remained through 2015. Following the Rams' move back to Los Angeles in January 2016, the MSHSAA voted to return the games to Plaster Field in 2016 and Faurot Field at the University of Missouri in Columbia in 2017.

Attendance Records

See also
 List of NCAA Division I FCS football stadiums

References

External links
 Plaster Stadium

College football venues
Missouri State Bears football
Sports venues in Springfield, Missouri
American football venues in Missouri
Works Progress Administration in Missouri
1941 establishments in Missouri
Sports venues completed in 1941